Tortured Soul (Italian:Anima tormentata) is a 1919 Italian silent film directed by Mario Caserini and starring Maria Jacobini, Andrea Habay and Alberto Collo. Alessandro Blasetti, a leading Italian director of the Fascist era, had his first contact with filmmaking by appearing as an extra.

Cast
 Maria Jacobini
 Andrea Habay
 Alberto Collo 
 Ida Carloni Talli 
 Alfredo Martinelli
 Alessandro Blasetti

References

Bibliography 
 Reich, Jacqueline & Garofalo, Piero. Re-viewing Fascism: Italian Cinema, 1922-1943. Indiana University Press, 2002.

External links 
 

1919 films
Italian silent feature films
1910s Italian-language films
Films directed by Mario Caserini
Italian black-and-white films